Magneetrots is a mountain in the Sipaliwini District of Suriname. It measures 310 metres.

History
The Magneetrots as well as the Tebutop, the Roseveltpiek, and the Kasikasima were first explored in 1904 during the Tapanahony expedition.

On 19 August, they tried again. Magnetic disturbances were observed by several expedition members, and therefore the mountain was named Magneetrots (English: magnet rock). The first part of the climb was a gentle slope upwards with many overhanging rocks, however near the top, there was a steep wall.

References

Bibliography
 
 

Mountains of Suriname
Sipaliwini District